NA-161 Bahawalnagar-II is a constituency for the National Assembly of Pakistan.

Election 2002 

General elections were held on 10 Oct 2002. Mian Mumtaz Ahmed Matiana of PPP won by 59,082 votes.

Election 2008 

General elections were held on 18 Feb 2008. Syed Mumtaz Alam Gillani of PPP won by 49,678 votes.

Election 2013 

General elections were held on 11 May 2013. Alam Dad Laleka of PML-N won by 95,060 votes and became the  member of National Assembly.

Election 2018 

General elections are scheduled to be held on 25 July 2018.

See also
NA-160 Bahawalnagar-I
NA-162 Bahawalnagar-III

References

External links 
Election result's official website

NA-189